Hédé-Bazouges (Gallo: Hédoe) is a commune in the Ille-et-Vilaine department in Brittany in northwestern France.

On 1 January 2008, the village of Saint-Symphorien was separated from the commune, and given the status of commune in its own right.

Prior to 22 March 2011, the commune was called Hédé.

It is Twinned with the village of Wortham in Suffolk, England.

Population
Inhabitants of Hédé-Bazouges are called Hédéens in French.

Sights
The town has a sculpture park in the church garden dedicated to the work of local resident Jean Boucher.

See also
Communes of the Ille-et-Vilaine department
Jean-Marie Valentin

References

External links

 Mayors of Ille-et-Vilaine Association  

Communes of Ille-et-Vilaine